Dawnette Ethilda Edge is a British medical researcher who is a Professor of Mental Health and Inclusivity at the University of Manchester.  Her research investigates racial inequalities in mental health, including the origins of the overdiagnosis of schizophrenia in British African-Caribbean people.

Early life and education 
Edge studied healthcare and welfare at the University of Salford, where she graduated with first class honours in 1993. She eventually trained in social sciences, completing a master's degree in social sciences also at the University of Salford. Edge eventually joined the University of Manchester as a graduate student, where she was supported by the NHS North West partnership. Edge earned her doctorate in medical sociology in 2003. Her doctoral research investigated maternal mental health and how Black mothers accessed mental health services before and after giving birth.

Research and career 
Edge was appointed to the board of trustees for African and Caribbean Mental Health Services, a grassroots organisation that looks to empower individuals to identify their mental health needs. Informed by her experiences on the board, Edge switched her focus to evidence-based interventions for communities of colour. As part of this work, she established a series of community-focussed mental health conferences that brought together members of NHS Mental Health Services Trusts, academics and volunteer groups. 

In 2006, Edge was appointed to the faculty at the University of Manchester, where she was eventually promoted to Professor of Mental Health. She became concerned that African and Caribbean populations were being over-diagnosed with personality disorders such as schizophrenia. The National Institute for Health and Care Excellence (NICE) guidelines include family interventions, but these are not always offered to non-white people. Edge has shown that Black people are more likely to experience a negative pathway in mental health care compared to their white counterparts. She has shown that they are more likely to be sectioned by the Mental Health Act, which can result in the breakdown of close relationships, and make effective family interventions unlikely. Supported by the National Institute for Health Research (NIHR), Edge has looked to develop culturally-sensitive family interventions.

Edge spent 2014 as a visiting scholar in Canada and the United States of America, where she studied how the countries supported the mental health of African Caribbean populations. Her research has been funded by the Medical Research Council (MRC).

Academic service 
Edge is an academic lead for equality, diversity and inclusion (EDI) at the University of Manchester. As part of this work, she is involved with the submission to the Race Equality Charter.

Selected publications

References 

Academics of the University of Manchester
Alumni of the University of Manchester
Alumni of the University of Salford
British women psychologists
Public health researchers
Black British women academics
Black British people in health professions
Year of birth missing (living people)
Living people